Olyndicus (?-170 BC), also known as Olonicus, was a Celtiberian war chief who led a rebellion against Rome, fighting against the praetor Lucius Canuleyus and his troops, in the province of Hispania Ulterior. According to Florus, he was a great leader, and a cunning and daring warrior.

Olyndicus was said to have behaved like a prophet and to have led his troops wielding a magical silver lance, sent to him by the gods from the sky.

See also
Tanginus
Celtiberian Wars

References

External links
 Elementos chamánicos y uránicos en el episodio del celtibero Olíndico (Shamanic elements about the topic of Olyndicus) (in Spanish).
 E-Keltoi: Celtiberian Ideologies and Religion
 La lanza de Olíndico (Spanish)

Celtic warriors
Spanish rebels